Government Polytechnic Ambikapur is a Government-run Technical Institute located in Ambikapur, Chhattisgarh, India. Established in 1982, it is one of the oldest technical institute in Chhattisgarh (erstwhile Madhya Pradesh). It is affiliated to Chhattisgarh Swami Vivekanand Technical University, Bhilai.

History
Established in 1982, it was established as 22nd polytechnic of Madhya Pradesh. Formerly, it was affiliated to Pandit Ravishankar Shukla University, Raipur. In 2005, it became affiliated to newly formed Chhattisgarh Swami Vivekanand Technical University, Bhilai.

Academics
The institute offers Diploma in Engineering in various fields.

References

Schools of mines in India
Engineering colleges in Chhattisgarh
Educational institutions established in 1982
1982 establishments in Madhya Pradesh